Marcantonio Colonna, 3rd Prince of Sonnino and 4th Marquess of Castelnuovo (Grande de España) (18 March 1724 – 16 August 1795) was an Italian nobleman, military and politician. He was Prince of Sonnino, Marquess of Castelnuovo, Grandee of Spain, and Knight of the Order of Saint Januarius. He became Viceroy of Sicily in 1775.

Biography
Marcantonio was born in Naples, Kingdom of Naples, to Ferdinando Colonna and Luisa Caracciolo. He became a courtier with the title of Gentiluomo di camera d'esercizio, and was very close to the young King Ferdinand IV during the regency of the Prince of San Nicandro and the Marquess Tanucci.

On June 16, 1765 he was sent as an extraordinary ambassador to Innsbruck, Austria, on the occasion of the marriage between the Infanta of Spain, Maria Luisa, daughter of Charles 3rd of Bourbon, and the then Archduke of Tuscany (future emperor) Pietro Leopoldo. He became commander of the naval volunteer battalions in 1773. He became Viceroy of Sicily and Captain general of Sicily in 1775.

In October 1774, he was sent as viceroy to Sicily. He replaced in this role, Giovanni Fogliani, who had engendered a revolt in Palermo that caused him to flee to Messina. The events in Palermo had been triggered by food shortages, and the death of a popular leader at the hands of Fogliani's surgeon. Marcantonio held office in Sicily until 1781. During his tenure, he enlarged the library of Palermo and built a public garden in Palermo.
He returned to Naples and was given the title of captain of the royal guards. He died in Naples in 1796.

References

|-

1724 births
1795 deaths
Colonna family
Italian nobility
Italian Army generals
Italian generals
Spanish generals
Viceroys of Sicily